George Clinton is an 1873 bronze sculpture depicting the American soldier and statesman of the same name by Henry Kirke Brown, installed in the United States Capitol, in Washington D.C., as part of the National Statuary Hall Collection. It is one of two statues donated by the U.S. state of New York. The statue is one of three by Brown in the Collection.

See also
 1873 in art

References

External links
 

1873 establishments in Washington, D.C.
1873 sculptures
Sculptures by Henry Kirke Brown
Bronze sculptures in Washington, D.C.
Monuments and memorials in Washington, D.C.
Clinton, George
Sculptures of men in Washington, D.C.
Statues of U.S. Founding Fathers